Glucuronosyl-N-acetylglucosaminyl-proteoglycan 4-alpha-N-acetylglucosaminyltransferase (alpha-N-acetylglucosaminyltransferase II glucuronyl-N-acetylglucosaminylproteoglycan alpha-1,4-N-acetylglucosaminyltransferase) is an enzyme with systematic name UDP-N-acetyl-D-glucosamine:beta-D-glucuronosyl-(1->4)-N-acetyl-alpha-D-glucosaminyl-proteoglycan 4-alpha-N-acetylglucosaminyltransferase. This enzyme catalyses the following chemical reaction

 UDP-N-acetyl-D-glucosamine + beta-D-glucuronosyl-(1->4)-N-acetyl-alpha-D-glucosaminyl-proteoglycan  UDP + N-acetyl-alpha-D-glucosaminyl-(1->4)-beta-D-glucuronosyl-(1->4)-N-acetyl-alpha-D-glucosaminyl-proteoglycan

This enzyme is involved in the biosynthesis of heparin and heparan sulfate.

References

External links 
 

EC 2.4.1